Jackson-Aitken Farm is a historic farm house, dairy barn and farm fields located at Andes in Delaware County, New York, United States. The farmhouse was built about 1850 and is a one and one half wood-frame structure in a vernacular Greek Revival style.  The barn is a large three story wooden building with a cross gabled banked entrance built in 1896.  It features a distinctive cupola.

It was listed on the National Register of Historic Places in 2003.

See also
National Register of Historic Places listings in Delaware County, New York

References

Houses on the National Register of Historic Places in New York (state)
National Register of Historic Places in Delaware County, New York
Houses completed in 1853
Houses in Delaware County, New York